Coventry Mall (also known as The Shoppes at Coventry) is a shopping mall in North Coventry Township, Pennsylvania (Pottstown, Pennsylvania), located at the interchange of Route 100 and Route 724. The mall is anchored by Boscov's, Kohl's, Gabe's, and Dick's Sporting Goods.

History
Opened as the Norco Mall in October, 1967, it featured Sears, Britt's Department Store (later Hess's), and Thrift Drug as anchors as well as thirteen smaller retail stores. In 1974 the original open-air plan was enclosed and expanded to include a new anchor store, J.M. Fields, a two-plex movie theater operated by the Fox Theatres chain, and more than a dozen new retail spaces. In 1982 the mall underwent further expansion and a name change to Coventry Mall. J. M. Fields closed and became Jefferson Ward in 1978, and later Bradlees in 1985. After Bradlees closed, it was subdivided between Ross Dress for Less and Dick's Sporting Goods, the former of which closed in 2014. A Pomeroy's department store was added in 1985. In 1987, this store became a Bon-Ton when that chain bought Pomeroy's; in 1993, it became Boscov's and now has 2 floors and rooftop parking (the latter of which has since been closed to the public). In 1987, a larger 8-plex movie theater was built outside the mall; the old theater was then converted into a food court.

Hess's sold most of its stores to The Bon-Ton in 1994, but was unable to complete a deal with Bon-Ton on the Coventry Mall store. It instead became JCPenney for a short time, then The Bon-Ton, before finally becoming Kohl's in 2004. That same year, Stoltz Real Estate Partners acquired the mall from The Goodman Co.

Sears closed in April 2012. Mall owner Coventry Retail LP failed to make payments for the property and Jones Lang LaSalle became the receiver of the mall in March 2013. On September 19, 2013, the mall was sold at auction to U.S. Bank National Association for $49.5 million. Jones Lang LaSalle continued as the receiver and manager of the mall. In December 2014, Limerick Furniture opened in the former Sears location.

On April 8, 2016, the Coventry Mall was sold to Pennmark Management Co., who planned on improving the mall by filling vacancies with new stores and restaurants. Gabe's, an off-priced retail store, opened on March 18, 2017, in a 45,000-square foot portion of the space formerly occupied by Sears. On May 10, 2018, Jo-Ann, which had up to that point been in an adjacent strip mall, opened a 14,310-square foot store in the mall proper.

In April 2022, it was revealed that the Coventry Mall would be redeveloped into The Shoppes at Coventry, with the interior of the mall closed and stores having exterior entrances like in a strip mall, with anchor stores including Boscov's, Dick's Sporting Goods, Gabe's, and Kohl's remaining open. Big Phil's Bar and Grill opened in the old TGI Fridays restaurant space in early 2022, with Roses Discount Store opening in another portion of the old Sears location that November. More tenants for other outdoor shops will later be announced.

References

External links 
 Coventry Mall (archived copy)

Shopping malls in Pennsylvania
Shopping malls established in 1967
Tourist attractions in Chester County, Pennsylvania
Buildings and structures in Chester County, Pennsylvania